Lebed Point (‘Nos Lebed’ \'nos 'le-bed\) is the rocky point on the south side of the entrance to Istros Bay on the east coast of Clarence Island in the South Shetland Islands, Antarctica.

The point is “named after the settlement of Lebed in Southern Bulgaria, and in connection with the fishing trawler Lebed of the Bulgarian company Ocean Fisheries – Burgas that operated in Antarctic waters off South Georgia in the 1970/71 season.  The Bulgarian fishermen, along with those of the Soviet Union, Poland and East Germany are the pioneers of modern Antarctic fishing industry.”

Location
British mapping in 1972 and 2009.

Maps
British Antarctic Territory. Scale 1:200000 topographic map. DOS 610 Series, Sheet W 61 54. Directorate of Overseas Surveys, Tolworth, UK, 1972.
South Shetland Islands: Elephant, Clarence and Gibbs Islands. Scale 1:220000 topographic map. UK Antarctic Place-names Committee, 2009.
 Antarctic Digital Database (ADD). Scale 1:250000 topographic map of Antarctica. Scientific Committee on Antarctic Research (SCAR). Since 1993, regularly upgraded and updated.

Notes

References
 Bulgarian Antarctic Gazetteer. Antarctic Place-names Commission. (details in Bulgarian, basic data in English)
 Lebed Point. SCAR Composite Gazetteer of Antarctica

External links
 Lebed Point. Copernix satellite image

Headlands of the South Shetland Islands
Ocean Fisheries – Burgas Co 
Bulgaria and the Antarctic